Jianzi, tī jianzi (踢毽子), tī jian (踢毽) or jianqiú (毽球), is a traditional Chinese national sport in which players aim to keep a heavily weighted shuttlecock in the air by using their bodies, apart from the hands, unlike in similar games Peteca and Indiaca. The primary source of jianzi is a Chinese ancient game called Cuju of the Han dynasty 2,000 years ago. Jianzi's competitive sport types are played on a badminton court using inner or outer lines in different types of jianzi's competitive sports, respectively. It can also be played artistically, among a circle of players in a street or park, with the objective to keep the shuttle 'up' and show off skills. In Vietnam, it is known as đá cầu and is the national sport. In the Philippines, it is known as sipa and was also the national sport until it was replaced by arnis in December 2009.

In recent years, the game has gained a formal following in around the globe. In English, both the sport and the object with which it is played are referred to as a "shuttlecock" or "featherball". The game is also popular in Malaysia, where it is known as "Capteh" or "Chapteh." It's a children's game before they can master "Sepak Raga".

Gameplay
The shuttlecock (called a jianzi in the Chinese game and also known in English as a 'Chinese hacky sack' or 'kinja') typically has four feathers fixed into a rubber sole or plastic discs. Some handmade jianzis make use of a washer or a coin with a hole in the centre.

During play, various parts of the body (except for the hands) are used to keep the shuttlecock from touching the ground. It is primarily balanced and propelled upwards using parts of the leg, especially the feet. Skilled players may employ a powerful overhead kick.
In China, the sport usually has two playing forms:
Circle kick among 5-10 people
Duel kick between two kickers or two sides.

The circle kick uses upward kicks only when keeping the shuttlecock from touching the ground. The duel kick has become popular among younger Chinese players, and uses "flat kick" techniques like goal shooting techniques in soccer sports. Therefore, the "powerful flat kick" techniques are applied in Chinese games as a major attacking skill.

Formal game

Competitively, the government-run game is called "Hacky-Sack (jianqiu 毽球)" played on a rectangular court 6.10 by 11.88 meters, divided by a net (much like badminton) at a height of 1.60 metres (1.50 metres for women).
A new style of Ti Jian Zi called "Chinese JJJ" was introduced in 2009. "JJJ" stands for "Competitive Jianzi-kicking" in Chinese with the three Chinese characters "竞技毽" all with "J" as first letter. This version uses a lower middle net of 90 cm and inner or outside lines of the standard badminton court.

The informal game
There are several variations of the game, such as trying to keep the feathercock in the air until an agreed target of kicks (e.g. 100) is reached, either alone or in a pair. In circle play, the aim may be simply to keep play going. In all but the most competitive formats, a skillful display is a key component of play.
There are 2 informal games in Chinese JJJ games using the same middle net: "Team game" having 3 players on each side & "Half court game" using just a half court for double player game only.

Freestyle
Freestyle discipline is very similar to freestyle footbag, where players perform various kicks, delays and other dexterities without touching the shuttlecock with their hands. Many footbag tricks were initially inspired by jianzi, but later it turned the other way around and jianzi freestylers looked for inspiration from the more developed sport of footbag.

History

Jianzi has been played since the Han dynasty (206 BC–220 AD), and was popular during the Six Dynasties period and the Sui and Tang dynasties. The game is believed to have evolved from cuju, a game similar to football that was used as military training. Several ancient books attest to its being played. Over time, the game spread throughout Asia, acquiring a variety of names along the way.

Jianzi came to Europe in 1936, when a Chinese athlete from the province of Jiangsu performed a demonstration at the 1936 Summer Olympics in Berlin. In Germany and other countries people began to learn and play the sport, now called "shuttlecock".

The International Shuttlecock Federation (ISF) was founded in 1999 and the first world championship was organized by Hungary in Újszász in 2000. Up until this point, various countries took turns organizing championships. The sport continues to receive recognition, and was included as a sport in the 2003 Southeast Asian Games and in the Chinese National Peasants' Games. Among the members of ISF are China, Taiwan, Finland, Germany, the Netherlands, Hungary, Laos, Vietnam, Greece, France, Romania, and Serbia. Vietnam is highly regarded, having won the world championship for ten consecutive years. On 11 August 2003, delegates from Finland, France, Germany, Greece, Hungary, Romania, and Serbia founded the Shuttlecock Federation of Europe (S.F.E.) in Ujszasz, Hungary.

After being invented in 2009, Chinese JJJ spread throughout China due to its techniques similar to football. In June 2010, Chinese JJJ's "The First Beijing Invitational Tournament" held, with players from more than 10 countries participating. In 2011, the first formal Chinese JJJ Championship was held in Shandong province, with other provinces planned to follow.

In June 1961, a film about the sport called The Flying Feather was made by the Chinese central news agency, winning a gold medal at an international film festival.

In August 2011, an American company released a toy called Kikbo based on jianzi.

In 2013, a Hong Kong company released KickShuttle. It is a form of shuttlecock not made of feather with similar weight.

Official jianzi for competitions
The official featherball used in the sport of shuttlecock consists of four equal-length goose or duck feathers conjoint at a rubber or plastic base. It weighs approximately 15-25 grams. The total length is 15 to 21 cm. The feathers vary in color, usually dyed red, yellow, blue and/or green. However, in competitions a white featherball is preferred. The Official Jianzi for Competitions
The shuttlecock used in Chinese JJJ games weighs 24-25 grams. The height from the bottom of rubber base to top of the shuttlecock is 14–15 cm, the width between tops of two opposite feathers is 14–15 cm.

Related games, derivatives and variants

Sepak takraw is popular in Thailand, using a light rattan ball about five inches in diameter. (Sepak means "kick" in Malay, and takraw means "ball" in Thai.)
Da cau in Vietnam, the game is popular among schoolchildren.
Indiaca or featherball is played with the same shuttlecock as jianzi but on a court, similar to a badminton court, and played over the net using the hands.
Kemari was played in Japan (Heian Period). It means "strike the ball with the foot".
Chinlone is a non-competitive Burmese game that uses a rattan ball and is played only in the circle form, not on a court.
Cuju or tsu chu, the possible forerunner of both football and jianzi
Myachi
UKick
Sipa
Ebon (game)
Footbag and footbag net
Hacky Sack
Footvolley
Bossaball
Basse
Kickit
Lyanga
 In France, pili, or plumfoot

Notes

References 

 "Chinese JJJ Rules and Judgement", by John Du, Beijing, May 2010, by China Society Pressing House

External links

 Basic Rules of Shuttlecock Sport

Individual sports
Chinese words and phrases
Team sports
Sports originating in China